Peter M. McCoy Jr. (born August 20, 1978) is an American attorney and politician who served as the United States Attorney for the District of South Carolina from 2020 to 2021. He was a member of the South Carolina House of Representatives from 2011 to 2020.

Education

McCoy earned his Bachelor of Arts from Hampden–Sydney College and his Juris Doctor from Regent University School of Law.

Legal career

McCoy was an Assistant Solicitor in the Ninth Circuit Solicitor's Office in Charleston. Until his appointment as United States Attorney, he was a partner at McCoy & Stokes in Charleston, South Carolina, where his practice focused on criminal defense in both state and federal courts, as well as family, personal injury, and probate law.

South Carolina House of Representatives 

From 2011 to 2020, McCoy served as a member of the South Carolina House of Representatives.

U.S. Attorney 

On February 26, 2020, President Donald Trump announced his intent to nominate McCoy to be the United States Attorney for the District of South Carolina. His nomination was officially sent to the United States Senate on March 2.

On March 30, 2020, U.S. Attorney General Bill Barr appointed McCoy as the interim U.S. Attorney for the District of South Carolina. He was confirmed by a voice vote of the Senate on June 18, 2020.

On February 8, 2021, he along with 55 other Trump-era attorneys were asked to resign. He announced his resignation on February 23, effective February 28.

Personal life 

McCoy lives with his wife and their three children on James Island. He is a member of Grace Episcopal Church where he teaches Sunday School for kindergartners.

References

External links
 Biography at U.S. Department of Justice
 
 

1978 births
Living people
20th-century American lawyers
21st-century American lawyers
People from Charleston, South Carolina
Hampden–Sydney College alumni
Republican Party members of the South Carolina House of Representatives
United States Attorneys for the District of South Carolina
Trump administration personnel
Regent University School of Law alumni
South Carolina lawyers